McRoss is an unincorporated community in Greenbrier County, West Virginia, United States. McRoss is located on U.S. Route 60, northeast of Rainelle.

References

Unincorporated communities in Greenbrier County, West Virginia
Unincorporated communities in West Virginia